The Jamaican political conflict is a long-standing feud between right-wing and left-wing elements in the country, often exploding into violence. The Jamaican Labour Party and the People's National Party have fought for control of the island for years and the rivalry has encouraged urban warfare in Kingston. Each side believes the other to be controlled by foreign elements, the JLP is said to be backed by the American Central Intelligence Agency and the PNP is said to have been backed by the Soviet Union and Cuba.

History

Pre-Independence beginnings
By 1943 the JLP and PNP had established themselves as Jamaica's main rival political parties coming out of the recent Caribbean labour unrest. After the election of 1944 violence became a common aspect of their rivalry. Alexander Bustamante began to encourage the attack of PNP sympathizers, claiming they were communists. Alexander Bustamante also started to specifically cater to his political constituents, such as offering migrant work visas specifically along political lines that favoured him.

Formation of garrisons
Jamaica gained independence in 1962, and by 1963 political parties were paying off members of the Rude boy subculture to engage in turf warfare with political rivals. Once the JLP would come to power they would demolish a PNP sympathising slum and construct Tivoli Gardens in its place, starting in 1965. The project would be monitored by Edward Seaga and Tivoli Gardens would be a JLP garrison, and the PNP would react by forming its own garrisons; solidifying the tradition of violent garrison communities in Jamaica. By the 1966 election gunfights became common, bombings occurred, and police would be routinely shot at. This resulted in more than 500 people injured, 20 people dead, and 500 arrested during police raids.

Escalation of political violence
Sporadic political violence would evolve into outright urban warfare after a series of violent outbursts. The Henry rebellion, the Coral Gardens incident, the anti-Chinese riots of 1965, the state of emergency of 1966–67, and finally the Rodney riots. These events were the beginnings of an ethnic nationalist element to Jamaican politics and a further normalisation of political violence in general in Jamaican society

Political violence had become commonplace in Jamaica. Political parties began paying off crime bosses for local gang support. Assassination threats and attempts also starting becoming more frequent. By 1974 the PNP openly avowed their support for the principles of democratic socialism. PNP candidate Michael Manley began public praise of Fidel Castro. The JLP emerged as a right wing counter to this new emerging leftism. The Central Intelligence Agency began supplying weapons to JLP vigilantes.

By the 1976 election over a hundred had been murdered during the conflict and political parties began forming paramilitary divisions. In 1978 five JLP supporters were massacred by official Jamaican soldiers. Reggae music became a voice for peace in the country and the landmark One Love Peace Concert was held in hopes of peace. By the 1980 election 844 people were murdered in political violence preceding the vote.

Involvement in the drug trade
By the 1980s the JLP gained control of the country and embraced neo-liberal policies. Gangs began to be unsatisfied with the lessening handouts given by their political leaders and due to DEA campaigns turned away from marijuana smuggling and to the cocaine trade. Newly enriched these gangs began to be more involved in governing the garrison communities they controlled. The JLP aligned gang Shower Posse was one of these newly enriched gangs. The CIA provided Shower Posse with arms, training, and transport to the United States.

2010 Kingston unrest

After international pressure the Jamaican government agreed to arrest extradite famed gang leader Christopher Coke. Some in the Jamaican media speculated that the long time it took to arrest Coke came from Prime Minister Bruce Golding's political assistance he received from Coke. During the raids and attempts to arrest Coke violent gunfights would break out throughout Kingston by his allies to prevent his capture.

Recent developments
Despite many peace accords it is still common for political parties to pay off criminals for support and encourage paramilitary garrisons.

Garrison communities
Garrison constituencies in Jamaica are housing developments erected by the government who house carefully selected residents that will wholly support a local politician. As of 2001 about 15 hardcore garrison communities exist in Jamaica. The residents of garrisons form vigilante groups that engage in ongoing political turf wars. Originally these groups were solely politically motivated but eventually they all came to be invested in the drug trade and became what are known as Jamaican posses. These posses are well armed, often equipped with assault rifles and grenade launchers. Since the 1980s these posses have participated more in the drug trade and relied less on politicians to arm them. Now about 80% of their weapons arrive from South Florida, while other weapons and armour appear to be police issued - suggesting that corrupt police officials are trading them with the posses.

See also
 Colombian conflict
 Mexican Dirty War

References

Jamaica
Cold War conflicts
Jamaica
Cuba–United States relations
Jamaica
Proxy wars
Riots and civil disorder in Jamaica
Terrorism in Jamaica
United States–Caribbean relations
Jamaica